The 2019 LSU Tigers football team represented Louisiana State University in the 2019 NCAA Division I FBS football season. The Tigers played their home games at Tiger Stadium (nicknamed Death Valley) in Baton Rouge, Louisiana, and competed in the West Division of the Southeastern Conference (SEC) where they were led by their third-year head coach Ed Orgeron.

LSU began the year ranked sixth in the preseason AP Poll, and were projected to finish second in the SEC West behind Alabama. The Tigers secured an undefeated regular season that included wins over top-ten-ranked teams Texas, Florida, Auburn, and Alabama. In the SEC Championship Game, LSU defeated Georgia to win their first conference title since 2011. LSU was ranked No. 1 in the final College Football Playoff rankings of the season, earning them a spot in the national semi-final game to be played at the Peach Bowl. They dominated fourth-ranked Oklahoma in that game, 63–28, to advance to the CFP Championship Game. There, they defeated the defending national champions Clemson, 42–25, to secure LSU's fourth national title in school history, the second undefeated champion in the CFP era, and the second 15–0 season among any team in the modern era.

LSU's record-setting offense was led by senior quarterback Joe Burrow, who won the Heisman Trophy by the largest margin in the history of the award, and broke several NCAA FBS records, including most touchdown passes (60), and highest passer rating (202.0). He was accompanied on offense by 1,400-yard running back Clyde Edwards-Helaire, and two 1,500-yard receivers, Ja'Marr Chase and Justin Jefferson, with the former winning the Biletnikoff Award as the best wide receiver in the country. The Tigers' offensive line won the Joe Moore Award as the nation's best offensive line unit. LSU's defense was anchored by two All-American defensive backs in Jim Thorpe Award winner Grant Delpit and true freshman Derek Stingley Jr. Linebacker Jacob Phillips led the SEC in tackles. Head coach Ed Orgeron was awarded several national Coach of the Year honors.

On the season, the Tigers outscored their opponents by a combined total of 726 to 328. Owing to their dominant performance against a historically difficult schedule, several pundits have called the team the greatest in college football history.

Previous season 
The Tigers finished the 2018 season 10–3, 5–3 in SEC play to finish in a tie for second place in the West division. They received an invitation to the Fiesta Bowl where they defeated UCF.

Preseason

SEC media poll
The SEC media poll was released on July 19, 2019, with the Tigers predicted to finish in second place in the West Division.

Schedule
LSU Tigers announced its 2019 football schedule on September 18, 2018. The 2019 schedule consists of 7 home and 5 away games in the regular season.

Schedule Source:

Roster

Depth chart

Coaching staff
Current staff as of August 17, 2019

Game summaries

Georgia Southern

LSU opened the 2019 season with a home non-conference game against Georgia Southern of the Sun Belt Conference. LSU won in a rout, 55–3.

LSU received the opening kick-off, and scored touchdowns on each of their first five possessions. In the first quarter, the Tigers scored via a 13-yard pass from Joe Burrow to Ja'Marr Chase, a one-yard run by Clyde Edwards-Helaire, and a nine-yard pass from Burrow to Justin Jefferson. To start the second quarter, they scored with two touchdown passes from Burrow to Terrace Marshall Jr., first from eight yards out and then from three yards out. Georgia Southern converted a 47-yard field goal with 5:13 left in the second quarter for their only points of the day. In the final minute of the first half, Burrow threw his fifth touchdown pass of the day, and third to Marshall Jr., from 11 yards out. This tied the LSU school record for single-game touchdown passes. Burrow was given one possession at the start of the second half to try and break the record, but the drive ended in a 39-yard field goal, and Burrow sat the remainder of the game. Backup quarterback Myles Brennan led another touchdown drive in the third quarter, ending in a two-yard touchdown run by Lanard Fournette. In the fourth quarter, kicker Cade York converted a 48-yard field goal to end the scoring for the day.

Joe Burrow, who completed 23 of 27 passes for 278 yards and five touchdowns in just over one half of play, was later named SEC Co-Offensive Player of the Week (with Alabama's Tua Tagovailoa). Regarding LSU's upgraded offense, Burrow said after the game, "I wanted 60 tonight. We’ve definitely come out of the stone age."

at No. 9 Texas

LSU's next game was a non-conference road game against ninth-ranked Texas of the Big 12 Conference. The Tigers won in a shootout, 45–38.

After forcing a Texas three-and-out to open the game, LSU scored on its first offensive possession via a 36-yard field goal by Cade York. In the second quarter, Texas took the lead with a 55-yard touchdown pass from Sam Ehlinger to Brennan Eagles. LSU responded with a six-yard touchdown pass from Joe Burrow to Justin Jefferson. With 1:41 left in the half, LSU added three points with a 33-yard field goal. Texas was forced to punt on its next possession, and LSU scored another touchdown in the final minute of the half with a 21-yard pass from Burrow to Jefferson. The score was 20–7 LSU at half-time.

On Texas's first drive of the second half, they scored on a 19-play, 86-yard drive that ended with a two-yard run by Sam Ehlinger. This was the first of nine consecutive scoring possessions by the two teams. LSU scored next with a 40-yard field goal by York. Texas responded with a 20-yard touchdown pass from Ehlinger to Jake Smith to bring the score to 23–21 LSU. On the first play of the fourth quarter, LSU's Joe Burrow completed a 26-yard touchdown pass to Terrace Marshall Jr. Texas pulled within two points again when Ehlinger completed a 44-yard touchdown pass to Devin Duvernay. LSU extended the lead with a 12-yard touchdown run by Clyde Edwards-Helaire, and then held Texas to a field goal on their next possession. With 2:27 remaining in the game, LSU scored the game-sealing touchdown on 3rd and 17 from their own 39 yard line with a 61-yard pass from Burrow to Justin Jefferson, and converted a two-point try with a pass from Burrow to Ja'Marr Chase to make the score 45–31. Texas drove 75 yards in just over two minutes and pulled within a touchdown with a 15-yard pass from Ehlinger to Duvernay with 22 seconds remaining. Their ensuing onside kick attempt failed, and LSU kneeled out the remainder of the clock to win the game.

Joe Burrow completed 471 passing yards and four touchdowns in the game, and was named Walter Camp National Offensive Player of the Week and SEC Offensive Player of the Week. His 471 yards were the second most in school history and most since Rohan Davey threw for 528 against Alabama in 2001. Three Tiger players finished with more than 100 yards receiving, a school first: Justin Jefferson, Ja'Marr Chase, and Terrace Marshall Jr. Kicker Cade York, who was 3/3 on field goal attempts, was named SEC Special Teams Player of the Week.

Northwestern State

For its third non-conference game of the season, LSU returned home to play in-state FCS foe Northwestern State of the Southland Conference. After a closer-than-expected first half, LSU pulled away for a decisive 65–14 victory. It was the 800th win in LSU program history.

Northwestern State received the opening kickoff, and their first drive ended with a failed fourth-and-seven attempt from the LSU 35 yard line. LSU's opening drive advanced to the Northwestern State eight yard line, but they settled for a 26-yard Cade York field goal. Northwestern State took the lead on the next drive with a 17-yard touchdown pass from Shelton Eppler to Quan Shorts. LSU responded with their own touchdown drive to reclaim the lead early in the second quarter via a four-yard run from Clyde Edwards-Helaire. LSU scored again shortly thereafter with a 14-yard touchdown pass from Joe Burrow to Terrace Marshall Jr. Northwestern State responded with another touchdown drive, ending with a 26-yard pass from Eppler to David Fitzwater to bring the score to 17–14 LSU. LSU's Edwards-Helaire scored again, this time from three yards out, with 3:27 remaining in the half. LSU's first play of its next possession ended with a Joe Burrow interception that was returned to their own 17 yard line, but Northwestern State missed a 35-yard field goal attempt to end the half. Some boos were heard as the home team headed to the locker room, with the score 24–14 at the half.

In the second half, LSU removed all doubt by scoring touchdowns on each of their first four possessions and holding Northwestern State scoreless for the remainder of the game. The Tigers scored first with a five-yard touchdown run from Joe Burrow, then a six-yard touchdown pass from Burrow to Marshall Jr., then a four-yard touchdown run from John Emery Jr., after which Burrow was pulled from the game. Backup Myles Brennan led another touchdown drive, ending with a one-yard score by Tyrion Davis-Price, making the score 51–14 at the end of the third quarter. In the fourth quarter, the Tigers scored on a 54-yard punt return touchdown by Trey Palmer, and a two-yard touchdown run by Davis-Price.

Joe Burrow completed 21 of 24 passes for 373 yards, two passing touchdowns, one interception, and a rushing touchdown. He became the sixth LSU quarterback to ever throw for 300-plus yards in consecutive games.

at Vanderbilt

To open the conference schedule, LSU traveled to face cross-divisional foe Vanderbilt for the first time since 2010. LSU won comfortably, 66–38, scoring the most points in regulation against an SEC opponent in school history.

Vanderbilt received the opening kickoff and capitalized with a five-yard touchdown run by Ke'Shawn Vaughn to open the scoring. LSU responded with their own touchdown drive, ending with a four-yard pass from Joe Burrow to Justin Jefferson. On their next drive, LSU needed just one play, which was a 64-yard touchdown pass from Burrow to Ja'Marr Chase. The Tigers scored twice more in the first quarter to make the score 28–7, first with a nine-yard run by Clyde Edwards-Helaire, and then with a 25-yard pass from Burrow to Chase. In the second quarter, the teams traded field goals, first with a 41-yarder by Vanderbilt's Ryley Guay, and then with a 25-yarder by LSU's Cade York. With 1:56 left in the half, Burrow and Chase connected for a touchdown once again, this time from 51 yards out. In the final minute of the half, LSU received the ball pinned at their own five yard line, and Vanderbilt's Elijah McAllister recovered a Clyde Edwards-Halaire fumble in the endzone for a score, making the score 38–17 at the half. Joe Burrow had 357 passing yards at half-time, a school record.

To open the second half, LSU's Micah Baskerville returned a Vanderbilt onside kick attempt 46 yards to the one yard line, after which Burrow threw his fifth touchdown pass to Racey McMath. Vanderbilt responded with a 52-yard touchdown run by Ke'Shawn Vaughn. LSU then scored again with a 16-yard touchdown pass from Burrow to Ja'Marr Chase, Burrow's sixth of the day. Baskerville then blocked a Vanderbilt punt attempt and recovered the ball for a touchdown to make the score 59–24 midway through the third quarter. Later in the third quarter, Vanderbilt scored again with an 18-yard pass from Riley Neal to Kalija Lipscomb. In the fourth quarter, LSU scored with a six-yard touchdown run by John Emery Jr., and Vanderbilt scored in the final minutes via a 47-yard pick-six thrown by Myles Brennan.

Joe Burrow's six touchdown passes set a school record. He completed 25 of 34 passes for 398 yards, becoming the first player in school history to throw for 350 or more yards in three consecutive games. He was named SEC Offensive Player of the Week for the third time of the season. Ja'Marr Chase had 10 receptions for 229 yards and four touchdowns.

Utah State

After a bye week, LSU played its fourth and final non-conference game at home against Utah State of the Mountain West Conference. LSU won in a blowout, 42–6.

LSU received the opening kickoff and scored on the opening drive with a seven-yard pass from Joe Burrow to Derrick Dillon. On the next drive, a Burrow pass was tipped and intercepted by Utah State's Cameron Haney and returned to the LSU 7 yard line. The Aggies settled for a 30-yard field goal three plays later. LSU turned the ball over on downs on their next drive, and Utah State once again kicked a field goal, this time from 47 yards out to bring the score to 7–6 at the end of the first quarter. Early in the second quarter, Burrow scored a one-yard touchdown run. Burrow threw a 25-yard touchdown pass to Ja'Marr Chase with 4:55 left in the quarter, which brought the score to 21–6 at half-time. In the third quarter, Joe Burrow threw a four-yard touchdown pass to Justin Jefferson, and then a 39-yard touchdown pass later in the quarter, again to Jefferson. On Burrow's last drive of the game before being benched, he threw an eight-yard touchdown pass to Thaddeus Moss to make the score 42–6 early in the fourth quarter. Both teams failed to score for the remainder of the game, with LSU missing a 53-yard field goal attempt.

Joe Burrow completed 27 of 38 passes for 344 yards and five touchdowns to along with 42 yards and another touchdown on the ground. He became the first LSU quarterback to ever throw for 300-plus yards in four consecutive games.

No. 7 Florida

On October 12, LSU played cross-division rival and seventh-ranked Florida at home, pulling away in the second half for a 42–28 win.

LSU received the opening kickoff and advanced to the Florida 26 yard-line, but Cade York's 44-yard field goal attempt was no good. LSU's next drive started with a 57-yard run by Clyde Edwards-Helaire, and ended with a nine-yard touchdown pass from Joe Burrow to Ja'Marr Chase to open the scoring of the game. Florida responded with their own scoring drive, ending with a five-yard touchdown pass from Kyle Trask to Trevon Grimes. In the second quarter, LSU and Florida each traded two touchdown drives. LSU scored with a seven-yard pass from Burrow to Justin Jefferson, and Florida responded with a one-yard touchdown pass from Emory Jones to La'Mical Perine. LSU then scored via a 39-yard run by Edwards-Helaire, and Florida closed out the half with a six-yard touchdown pass from Trask to Van Jefferson with four seconds remaining, bringing the score to 21–21.

Florida took a 28–21 lead on the opening possession of the second half with a two-yard pass from Kyle Trask to Van Jefferson. LSU tied the game up again with a five-yard touchdown run by Edwards-Helaire. A 33-yard touchdown run by Tyrion Davis-Price on LSU's next possession regained them the lead. Midway through the fourth quarter, Florida threatened to tie the game again, advancing to the LSU 16 yard-line, but Trask threw an interception in LSU's endzone. The Tigers put the game out of reach on the next possession with a 54-yard touchdown pass from Burrow to Ja'Marr Chase to bring the score to 42–28 with 5:43 remaining. Florida advanced to the LSU two-yard line in the final minute, but turned the ball over on downs, after which LSU kneeled out the remainder of the clock.

Joe Burrow failed to throw for 300 or more yards for the first time in five games, finishing with 293 yards and three touchdowns on 21-of-24 attempts. Clyde Edwards-Helaire had 134 yards and two touchdowns. Ja-Marr Chase had seven receptions for 127 yards and two touchdowns, and Justin Jefferson had 10 receptions for 123 yards and a touchdown.

at Mississippi State

Next, LSU traveled to Starkville, Mississippi to play divisional foe Mississippi State. LSU won in another rout, 36–13.

LSU advanced to within the Mississippi State 10 yard-line on each of their first three drives, but had to settle for field goals each time. Cade York converted from 20, 23, and 25 yards to make the score 9–0 midway through the second quarter. Mississippi State made the score 9–7 with a 12-yard touchdown run by Garrett Shrader. LSU quickly re-asserted itself with a 60-yard touchdown pass from Joe Burrow to Racey McMath, then an interception of Mississippi State's Garrett Shrader by JaCoby Stevens, and another touchdown pass from Burrow, to Ja'Marr Chase from eight yards out. The score was 22–7 at half-time. In the third quarter, LSU scored twice more, with a 37-yard touchdown pass from Burrow to Derrick Dillon, and then an 18-yard touchdown pass from Burrow to Justin Jefferson, after which the score was 36–7. Neither team scored again until Mississippi State scored a touchdown in the final minute of the game, a 24-yard pass from Shrader to Stephen Guidry, to make the score 36–13.

Joe Burrow completed 25 of 32 attempts for 327 yards and four touchdowns. He passed LSU's single season passing touchdowns record (29) during the game.

Auburn

LSU returned home on October 26 for a top-ten showdown against ninth-ranked Auburn. LSU's offense struggled against Auburn's defense, putting up a season-low 23 points, but pulled out the win, 23–20.

Auburn struck first with a 30-yard field goal by Anders Carlson. Early in the second quarter, LSU took the lead with a 20-yard touchdown pass from Joe Burrow to Terrace Marshall Jr. Later in the quarter, Auburn's punt to LSU's Derek Stingley Jr. was fumbled by Stingley and recovered by Auburn on the LSU 22 yard-line. Auburn took advantage of the turnover by scoring via a one-yard touchdown run by Bo Nix. LSU tied the game at 10–10 with a 20-yard field goal by Cade York with 33 seconds remaining in the half.

In the third quarter, Auburn took a 13–10 lead with a 23-yard field goal by Carlson. LSU's next two possessions ended with a failed fourth down attempt on the Auburn 2 yard-line, and a Burrow interception. LSU regained the lead late in the third quarter with a six-yard touchdown run by Clyde Edwards-Helaire, and then in the early fourth quarter, a seven-yard touchdown run by Burrow. Most of the fourth quarter was a defensive struggle between the two teams, with the teams trading six consecutive punts. With 2:32 remaining, Auburn pulled within three points with a five-yard touchdown pass from Nix to Seth Williams. Their onside kick attempt was recovered by LSU's Derrick Dillon, and LSU was able to wind down the remainder of the clock to win the game.

Joe Burrow finished the game with 32-of-42 attempts for 321 yards, one touchdown pass, one rushing touchdown, and an interception. This was his eighth career 300-yard game, a school record. Clyde Edwards-Helaire ran for 136 yards and a touchdown on 26 attempts. Ja'Marr Chase led the team with eight receptions for 123 yards.

at No. 3 Alabama

After a second bye week, LSU traveled to Tuscaloosa to play rival Alabama. Heading into the game, LSU was ranked No. 1 and Alabama No. 2 in the AP Poll. The season's first College Football Playoff rankings were released on the Tuesday prior to the game, with LSU ranked No. 2 and Alabama ranked No. 3. Alabama quarterback Tua Tagovailoa, who was only 20 days removed from a minor ankle surgery, was making his return, and the battle between him and Joe Burrow was expected to play a major role in the Heisman Trophy race. Adding even more aura of spectacle to the game was the attendance of President Donald Trump. Alabama was a six-point betting favorite heading into the game. LSU won the game in a shootout, 46–41.

On Alabama's opening possession, the Crimson Tide advanced to the LSU 8-yard line, but the ball slipped out of Tua Tagovailoa's hand for a fumble, recovered by LSU's Ray Thornton. LSU responded with a touchdown drive ending with a 33-yard pass from Joe Burrow to Ja'Marr Chase. Alabama gave LSU a short field again when they fumbled a punt snap on their next drive, after which LSU scored via  a 40-yard field goal by Cade York. Alabama got on the board late in the first quarter with a 77-yard punt return touchdown by Jaylen Waddle. Early in the second quarter, LSU scored with a 29-yard pass from Burrow to Terrace Marshall Jr. Alabama pulled within three with a 64-yard touchdown pass from Tagovailoa to DeVonta Smith. After a 45-yard field goal by York with 4:20 remaining in the first half, LSU scored again with a one-yard touchdown run by Clyde Edwards-Helaire with 26 seconds remaining. Alabama's Tua Tagovailoa threw an interception on their next play, returned by LSU's Patrick Queen to the Alabama 26-yard line. LSU was able to score after a 15-yard penalty on Alabama and then a 13-yard pass from Burrow to Edwards-Helaire to make the score 33–13 at half-time.

In the third quarter, Alabama scored with a 15-yard touchdown pass from Tagovailoa to Najee Harris. Early in the fourth quarter, Harris scored again on a one-yard run, to make the score 33–27 LSU. LSU then scored with a five-yard run by Edwards-Helaire, but Alabama pulled within a score again with a five-yard touchdown pass from Tagovailoa to Jerry Jeudy with 5:32 remaining. LSU went up 46–34 with 1:37 remaining with a seven-yard touchdown run by Edwards-Helaire, but Alabama scored on their next play with an 85-yard touchdown pass from Tagovailoa to DeVonta Smith with 1:21 remaining. Alabama's onside kick attempt was recovered by LSU's Justin Jefferson, and, after a first down run by Edwards-Helaire, LSU kneeled out the rest of the clock to win the game, 46–41.

LSU's 46 points were the most ever scored on Alabama in Bryant–Denny Stadium in regulation. The win also snapped an eight-game losing streak to Alabama by LSU. Joe Burrow finished with 31-of-39 attempts for 393 yards and three touchdowns. He earned his second Walter Camp National Offensive Player of the Week honors for the performance. Burrow was named SEC Co-Offensive Player of the Week, sharing the award with teammate Clyde Edwards-Helaire, who had 180 total yards and four total touchdowns (three rushing, one receiving). Ja'Marr Chase had 140 receiving yards and a touchdown in the game.

at Ole Miss

LSU next traveled to Oxford, Mississippi to play Ole Miss in the Magnolia Bowl. LSU won by a score of 58–37.

LSU opened the scoring on their opening drive with a 34-yard touchdown pass from Joe Burrow to Ja'Marr Chase. After each team traded missed field goal attempts, LSU scored again with a four-yard run by Tyrion Davis-Price. Two more second quarter scores by LSU, the first a 51-yard pass from Burrow to Chase, and the second a 12-yard pass from Burrow to Justin Jefferson, made the score 28–0. Ole Miss got on the board in the second quarter with a five-yard touchdown run by John Rhys Plumlee, and LSU converted a 33-yard field goal in the final seconds of the half to make the score 31–7 at half-time.

Ole Miss scored on the opening possession of the third quarter with a 46-yard touchdown run by Plumlee. After a 27-yard LSU field goal, Ole Miss scored again with a 60-yard run by Plumlee to make the score 34–23. LSU responded with a seven-yard touchdown pass from Burrow to Jefferson, and then converted a 52-yard field goal after an Ole Miss interception to make the score 44–23 heading into the fourth quarter. Early in the final quarter, Joe Burrow threw an interception, and Ole Miss scored on the next play with a 35-yard run by Plumlee. Burrow threw another interception on the next drive, but the LSU defense forced a turnover on downs. LSU scored with a 61-yard touchdown pass from Burrow to Chase on the next drive. Ole Miss scored its last points with 3:19 to go with a 55-yard pass from Matt Corral to Elijah Moore, but LSU scored once again on the next play with a 49-yard touchdown run by Clyde Edwards-Helaire, which ended the scoring at 58–37.

Joe Burrow set a career high with 489 yards to go along with five touchdown passes. He passed Rohan Davey's LSU single season passing yards record during the game. Burrow also completed 17 consecutive passes at one point, setting a school record.  Ja'Marr Chase had 227 receiving yards and three touchdowns, and was later named SEC Offensive Player of the Week. Clyde Edwards-Helaire had 172 rushing yards and a touchdown.

Arkansas

For the second-to-last game of the regular season, LSU faced rival Arkansas in a battle for the Golden Boot, and with an opportunity to secure LSU's spot in the SEC Championship Game with a win. LSU did just that with a 56–20 victory.

LSU scored on the game's opening drive with a 37-yard touchdown pass from Joe Burrow to Ja'Marr Chase. Arkansas converted two field goals, from 24 yards and 47 yards, to make the score 7–6 midway through the second quarter. LSU scored touchdowns on their final three possessions of the first half via a two-yard run by Tyrion Davis-Price, a 27-yard run by Clyde Edwards-Helaire, and a 10-yard pass from Burrow to Justin Jefferson, to make the score 28–6 at half-time.

Arkansas opened the second-half with a missed 45-yard field goal attempt. LSU fumbled on its first possession, but then the Tigers scored on four consecutive possessions, with a 50-yard pass from Burrow to Chase, a 26-yard run by Edwards-Helaire, an 89-yard run by Edwards-Helaire, and a 39-yard run by John Emery Jr. The score was then 56–6 early in the fourth quarter. Arkansas then scored with a 24-yard pass from Michael Woods II to Jack Lindsey, then recovered an onside kick attempt and scored with a two-yard run by Devwah Whaley to end the scoring on the day at 56–20.

Clyde Edwards-Helaire had his fourth consecutive 100-yard game by running for a career-high 188 yards and three touchdowns. Joe Burrow passed for 327 yards and three touchdowns. Ja'Marr Chase added 144 receiving yards and two touchdowns. Linebacker JaCoby Stevens, who had a career high three sacks and four tackles for loss, was named SEC Defensive Player of the Week. Safety Maurice Hampton, who was making his first career start in place of the injured Grant Delpit, had six tackles and was named SEC Freshman of the Week.

Texas A&M

LSU's regular season finale was against Texas A&M. The previous meeting between the two schools tied the NCAA record for most overtimes (seven) and set the FBS record for most combined points in a game (146), in which the Tigers lost to the Aggies, 74–72. The 2019 game was not nearly as close, as LSU secured an undefeated regular season with a 50–7 blowout win. Quarterback Joe Burrow, in his final home game as a Tiger, made a pregame introduction to great fanfare wearing a jersey with the name "Burreaux" on the back, paying tribute to the French heritage of the state and university.

LSU jumped out to a 31–0 lead by scoring on each of their first five possessions. The Tigers received the opening kickoff and scored in six plays with a five-yard touchdown run by Clyde Edwards-Helaire. Their next drive ended with a 12-yard touchdown pass from Joe Burrow to Justin Jefferson. Late in the first quarter, they scored again with a 78-yard pass from Burrow to Ja'Marr Chase. In the second quarter, LSU scored with a four-yard touchdown run by Tyrion Davis-Price, and a 51-yard field goal by Cade York. The score was 31–0 at half-time. In the third quarter, LSU's Cade York converted a 50-yard field goal, and then Texas A&M scored their only points of the day with a one-yard run by Isaiah Spiller. LSU responded with an 18-yard touchdown pass from Burrow to Chase, then intercepting a pass from Texas A&M's Kellen Mond, and scoring another touchdown, a 58-yard pass from backup quarterback Myles Brennan to Racey McMath. Late in the fourth quarter, the Tigers pinned the Aggies at their own 1-yard line with a punt, and then Neil Farrell Jr. sacked James Foster in the endzone for a safety to end the scoring on the day at 50–7.

Joe Burrow had 352 passing yards and three touchdowns in the game, and in the process set the SEC record for single-season passing yards previously held by Kentucky's Tim Couch, and tied the SEC record for single-season passing touchdowns, shared with Missouri's Drew Lock.

vs. No. 4 Georgia (SEC Championship)

LSU, as undefeated champions of the SEC West Division, faced off against 11–1 East Division champion Georgia in the SEC Championship Game in Atlanta. Heading into the game, LSU was ranked second and Georgia fourth in the College Football Playoff rankings. There was widespread speculation that both teams could possibly make it into the playoff, depending on the outcome of the game. LSU was considered a 7.5-point betting favorite. LSU removed all doubt about its resume by winning comfortably, 37–10. This was LSU's 16th conference championship in school history, its 12th in the Southeastern Conference, and first since 2011.

After a Georgia punt on the game's opening possession, LSU opened the scoring with a 23-yard touchdown pass from Joe Burrow to Ja'Marr Chase. LSU scored again late in the first quarter after a Georgia missed field goal attempt with a seven-yard pass from Burrow to Terrace Marshall Jr. Georgia got on the board early in the second quarter with a 39-yard field goal by Rodrigo Blankenship. LSU's Cade York converted his own field goal, from 41 yards out, with 2:22 remaining in the half. Georgia's next possession ended in a Jake Fromm interception to Derek Stingley Jr., but LSU's 48-yard field goal attempt missed with 14 seconds to go kept the score at 17–3 LSU at half-time.

LSU's opening possession of the second half ended with a 28-yard field goal by York, and Georgia's ensuing possession resulted in a 37-yard miss by Blankenship. LSU then quickly widened its lead with an 80-yard drive that included a 71-yard pass from Burrow to Justin Jefferson and ended with a four-yard touchdown pass from Burrow to Marshall Jr., followed by another interception of Fromm by Stingley Jr., and then an eight-yard touchdown pass from Burrow to Jefferson to make the score 34–3 at the end of the third quarter. In the fourth quarter, Georgia scored its only touchdown via a two-yard pass from Fromm to George Pickens, and LSU scored with a 50-yard field goal by York to end the scoring at 37–10.

Joe Burrow's performance, with 349 passing yards, four touchdowns, 41 rushing yards, and a 16-yard reception, was described by the Associated Press as "completing his Heisman Trophy coronation". He was named MVP of the game. Justin Jefferson had seven receptions for 115 yards and a touchdown.

vs. No. 4 Oklahoma (Peach Bowl)

In the final College Football Playoff rankings of the year, LSU moved from second to first, passing Ohio State, who had beaten Wisconsin in the Big Ten Championship Game, 34–21. LSU's opponent in the CFP semi-final, the Peach Bowl, was fourth-ranked Oklahoma, champions of the Big 12 Conference at 12–1. LSU entered the game as 13.5-point betting favorites. LSU exceeded those high expectations by destroying the Sooners 63–28.

After an Oklahoma three-and-out to open the game, LSU scored in three plays with a 19-yard touchdown pass from Joe Burrow to Justin Jefferson. After trading three-and-outs, Oklahoma responded with a three-yard touchdown run by Kennedy Brooks. The score was tied at 7–7, but LSU put the game out of reach by scoring touchdowns on each of their next seven possessions. Before the end of the first quarter, they scored via an eight-yard pass from Burrow to Terrace Marshall Jr., and a 35-yard pass from Burrow to Jefferson. In the second quarter, LSU scored with a 42-yard pass from Burrow to Jefferson, then a 30-yard pass from Burrow to Jefferson. Oklahoma temporarily stopped the bleeding with a two-yard touchdown run by Jalen Hurts, but LSU responded with a 62-yard touchdown pass from Burrow to Thaddeus Moss and a two-yard pass from Burrow to Marshall Jr. before the half. The score at half-time was 49–14. Joe Burrow had seven touchdown passes in the first half, which tied the all-time NCAA full-game bowl record, and Justin Jefferson's four touchdown receptions also tied the all-time full-game bowl record.

LSU opened the second half with a touchdown drive that ended with a two-yard run by Burrow, his eighth touchdown of the day, after which he and most other offensive starters were benched. Oklahoma's next possession ended with a 12-yard touchdown run by Hurts. After a missed 46-yard field goal attempt by LSU's Cade York early in the fourth quarter, Oklahoma scored again with a one-yard touchdown run by T.J. Pledger. LSU scored once more with a six-yard touchdown run by John Emery Jr. with 3:59 remaining to end the scoring at 63–28.

Joe Burrow had 493 passing yards, seven passing touchdowns, and a rushing touchdown in just over one half of play; he was named Offensive MVP of the game. Linebacker K'Lavon Chaisson was named Defensive MVP after finishing with two sacks and six tackles. Justin Jefferson finished with 14 receptions for 227 yards and four touchdowns in the game.

vs. No. 3 Clemson (National Championship)

By winning the Peach Bowl, LSU advanced to the College Football Playoff National Championship to play the winner of the Fiesta Bowl, third-seeded Clemson. The game was played at the Mercedes-Benz Superdome in New Orleans, mirroring LSU's previous appearances in national championship games in 2012, 2008, and 2004. Clemson was the defending national champion and on a 29-game winning streak, but LSU was considered a 5.5-point betting favorite heading into the game.

To open the game, both teams were forced to punt on each of their first two possessions. Clemson opened the scoring with a one-yard touchdown run by quarterback Trevor Lawrence. LSU evened the score with a 52-yard touchdown pass from Joe Burrow to Ja'Marr Chase. Early in the second quarter, Clemson regained the lead with a 52-yard field goal by B.T. Potter, and then extended the lead on their next possession with a 36-yard touchdown run by Tee Higgins. LSU scored touchdowns on their next three possessions to close out the first half: first on a three-yard run by Burrow, then a 14-yard pass from Burrow to Chase, and then a six-yard pass from Burrow to Thaddeus Moss with 10 seconds remaining in the half. The score was 28–17 LSU at half-time.

In the third quarter, Clemson pulled within three with a three-yard touchdown run by Travis Etienne and a successful two-point conversion via a pass from Lawrence to Amari Rodgers. LSU extended the lead with a four-yard touchdown pass from Burrow to Moss late in the quarter. Early in the fourth quarter, LSU scored again, with a 24-yard touchdown pass from Burrow to Terrace Marshall Jr. to make the score 42–25. LSU's defense held Clemson scoreless throughout the fourth quarter to help seal the victory.

With the win, LSU finished as undefeated College Football Playoff champions, and were later crowned unanimous national champions by the polls. This was LSU's fourth national title in school history, and first since the 2007 season. It was their first undefeated season since 1958, and the second ever 15–0 season by any FBS team in the modern era (after Clemson the previous season). Joe Burrow had 463 passing yards and five touchdowns in the game, and was named Offensive MVP. Linebacker Patrick Queen had eight total tackles, including 0.5 sacks and 2.5 tackles for loss and was named Defensive MVP.

Rankings

Awards and honors

Players drafted into the NFL

The 2020 NFL Draft was held remotely (due to the ongoing coronavirus pandemic) from April 23–25. LSU had the most players selected in the draft with 14. This tied the 2003 Ohio State NFL Draft record for a single school during a seven-round draft.  LSU also had the most first-round selections of the draft with five, including first overall pick Joe Burrow. LSU also tied the 2016 Ohio State Buckeyes with ten draft picks taken within the first three rounds.

References

LSU
LSU Tigers football seasons
College Football Playoff National Champions
Southeastern Conference football champion seasons
Peach Bowl champion seasons
College football undefeated seasons
LSU Tigers football